Arabic poetry ( ash-shi‘ru al-‘Arabīyyu) is the earliest form of Arabic literature. Present knowledge of poetry in Arabic dates from the 6th century, but oral poetry is believed to predate that.

Arabic poetry is categorized into two main types, rhymed or measured, and prose, with the former greatly preceding the latter. The rhymed poetry falls within fifteen different meters collected and explained by al-Farahidi in The Science of ‘Arud. Al-Akhfash, a student of al-Farahidi, later added one more meter to make them sixteen. The meters of the rhythmical poetry are known in Arabic as "seas" (buḥūr). The measuring unit of seas is known as "taf‘īlah," and every sea contains a certain number of taf'ilas which the poet has to observe in every verse (bayt) of the poem. The measuring procedure of a poem is very rigorous. Sometimes adding or removing a consonant or a vowel can shift the bayt from one meter to another. Also, in rhymed poetry, every bayt has to end with the same rhyme (qāfiyah) throughout the poem.

Al-Kʰalīl b. ˀAḫmad al-Farāhīdī (711 – 786 A. D.) was the first Arab scholar to subject the prosody of Arabic poetry to a detailed phonological study. He failed to produce a coherent, integrated theory which satisfies the requirements of generality, adequacy, and simplicity; instead, he merely listed and categorized the primary data, thus producing a meticulously detailed but incredibly complex formulation which very few indeed are able to master and utilize.

Researchers and critics of Arabic poetry usually classify it in two categories: classical and modern poetry. Classical poetry was written before the Arabic renaissance (An-Nahḍah). Thus, all poetry that was written in the classical style is called "classical" or "traditional poetry" since it follows the traditional style and structure. It is also known as "vertical poetry" in reference to its vertical parallel structure of its two parts. Modern poetry, on the other hand, deviated from classical poetry in its content, style, structure, rhyme and topics.

Pre-Islamic poetry
One of the first major poets in the pre-Islamic era is Imru' al-Qais, the last king of the kingdom of Kinda. Although most of the poetry of that era was not preserved, what remains is well regarded as among the finest Arabic poetry to date. In addition to the eloquence and artistic value, pre-Islamic poetry constitutes a major source for classical Arabic language both in grammar and vocabulary, and as a reliable historical record of the political and cultural life of the time.

Poetry held an important position in pre-Islamic society with the poet or sha'ir filling the role of historian, soothsayer and propagandist. Words in praise of the tribe (qit'ah) and lampoons denigrating other tribes (hija) seem to have been some of the most popular forms of early poetry. The sha'ir represented an individual tribe's prestige and importance in the Arabian peninsula, and mock battles in poetry or zajal would stand in lieu of real wars. 'Ukaz, a market town not far from Mecca, would play host to a regular poetry festival where the craft of the sha'irs would be exhibited.

Alongside the sha'ir, and often as his poetic apprentice, was the rawi or reciter. The job of the rawi was to learn the poems by heart and to recite them with explanations and probably often with embellishments. This tradition allowed the transmission of these poetic works and the practice was later adopted by the huffaz for their memorisation of the Qur'an. At some periods there have been unbroken chains of illustrious poets, each one training a rawi as a bard to promote his verse, and then to take over from them and continue the poetic tradition. For example, Tufayl trained 'Awas ibn Hajar, 'Awas trained Zuhayr, Zuhayr trained his son Ka`b, Ka`b trained al-Hutay'ah, al-Hutay'ah trained Jamil Buthaynah and Jamil trained Kuthayyir `Azza.

Among the most famous poets of the pre-Islamic era are Imru' al-Qais, Samaw'al ibn 'Adiya, al-Nabigha, Tarafa, Zuhayr bin Abi Sulma, and Antarah ibn Shaddad. Other poets, such as Ta'abbata Sharran, al-Shanfara, Urwa ibn al-Ward, were known as su'luk or vagabond poets, much of whose works consisted of attacks on the rigidity of tribal life and praise of solitude. Some of these attacks on the values of the clan and of the tribe were meant to be ironic, teasing the listeners only in order finally to endorse all that the members of the audience held most dear about their communal values and way of life. While such poets were identified closely with their own tribes, others, such as al-A'sha, were known for their wanderings in search of work from whoever needed poetry.

The very best of these early poems were collected in the 8th century as the Mu'allaqat meaning "the hung poems" (traditionally thought because they were hung on or in the Kaaba) and the Mufaddaliyat meaning al-Mufaddal's examination or anthology. The Mu'allaqat also aimed to be the definitive source of the era's output with only a single example of the work of each of the so-called "seven renowned ones," although different versions differ in which "renowned ones" they chose. The Mufaddaliyat on the other hand contains rather a random collection.

There are several characteristics that distinguish pre-Islamic poetry from the poetry of later times. One of these characteristics is that in pre-Islamic poetry more attention was given to the eloquence and the wording of the verse than to the poem as whole. This resulted in poems characterized by strong vocabulary and short ideas but with loosely connected verses. A second characteristic is the romantic or nostalgic prelude with which pre-Islamic poems would often start. In these preludes, a thematic unit called "nasib," the poet would remember his beloved and her deserted home and its ruins. This concept in Arabic poetry is referred to as "al-woqouf `ala al-atlal" (الوقوف على الأطلال / standing by the ruins) because the poet would often start his poem by saying that he stood at the ruins of his beloved; it is a kind of ubi sunt.Some famous pre-Islamic poets''':

 Abu Layla al-Muhalhel
 Antarah ibn Shaddad
 Imru' al-Qais
 Al-Khansa
 Al-A'sha
 Zuhayr bin Abi Sulma 
 Amr ibn Kulthum 
 Harith ibn Hilliza Al-Yashkuri 
 Labīd 
 Tarafa 
 Al-Nabigha

Islamic poetry

It was the early poems' importance to Islamic scholarship which led to their preservation. Not only did the poems illuminate life in the early years of Islam and its antecedents but they would also prove the basis for the study of linguistics of which the Qur'an was regarded as the pinnacle. Many of the pre-Islamic forms of verse were retained and improved upon. Naqa'id or flytings, where two poets exchange creative insults, were popular with al-Farazdaq and Jarir swapping a great deal of invective. The tradition continued in a slightly modified form as zajal, in which two groups 'joust' in verse, and remains a common style in Lebanon.

Court poets

Ghaylan ibn 'Uqbah (c. 696 – c. 735), nicknamed Dhu al-Rummah, is usually regarded as the last of the Pre-islamic  poets. His works had continued the themes and style of the pre-Islamic poets particularly eulogising the harsh but simple desert life, traditionally recited round a campfire. Although such themes continued and were returned to by many modern, urban poets, this poetic life was giving way to court poets. The more settled, comfortable and luxurious life in Umayyad courts led to a greater emphasis on the ghazal or love poem. Chief amongst this new breed of poet was Abu Nuwas. Not only did Abu Nuwas spoof the traditional poetic form of the qasida and write many poems in praise of wine, his main occupation was the writing of ever more ribald ghazal many of them openly homosexual.

While Nuwas produced risqué but beautiful poems, many of which pushed to the limit what was acceptable under Islam, others produced more religiously themed poetry. It is said that Nuwas struck a bargain with his contemporary Abu al-Alahijah: Abu Nuwas would concentrate on wine and love poems whilst al-Alahijah would write homilies. These homilies expressed views on religion, sin and the afterlife, but occasionally strayed into unorthodox territory. While the work of al-Alahijah was acceptable, others such as the poet Salih ibn 'Abd al-Quddus were executed for heresy. Waddah al-Yaman, now the national poet of Yemen, was also executed for his verse, but this was probably due to his over-familiarity with the wife of the caliph Al-Walid I.

Court poets were joined with court singers who simply performed works included Ibrahim al-Mawsili, his son Ishaq al-Mawsili and Ibrahim ibn al-Mahdi son of caliph al-Mahdi. Many stories about these early singers were retold in the Kitab al-Aghani or Book of Songs by Abu al-Faraj al-Isfahani.

The Sufi tradition also produced poetry closely linked to religion. Sufism is a mystical interpretation of Islam and it emphasised the allegorical nature of language and writing. Many of the works of Sufi poets appear to be simple ghazal or khamriyyah. Under the guise of the love or wine poem they would contemplate the mortal flesh and attempt to achieve transcendence. Rabia al-Adawiyya, Abd Yazid al-Bistami and Mansur al-Hallaj are some of the most significant Sufi poets, but the poetry and doctrine of al-Hallaj was eventually considered heretic for saying "I am the Truth," which came to be compared as literal incarnation. Al Hallaj was crucified and later became known as a Martyr.

The caliph himself could take on the role of court poet with al-Walid II a notable example, but he was widely disliked for his immorality and was deposed after only a year.

Badi poetry
An important doctrine of Arabic poetry from the start was its complexity, but during the period of court poetry this became an art form in itself known as badi`. There were features such as metaphor, pun, juxtaposing opposites and tricky theological allusions. Bashar ibn Burd was instrumental in developing these complexities which later poets felt they had to surpass. Although not all writers enjoyed the baroque style, with argumentative letters on the matter being sent by Ibn Burd and Ibn Miskawayh, the poetic brinkmanship of badi led to a certain formality in poetic art, with only the greatest poets' words shining through the complex structures and wordplay. This can make Arabic poetry even more difficult to translate than poetry from other languages, with much of a poet's skill often lost in translation.

Arabic poetry declined after the 13th century along with much of the literature due to the rise of Persian and Turkish literature. It flowered for a little longer in al-Andalus (Islamic Spain) but ended with the expulsion of the Arabs in 1492. The corpus suffered large-scale destruction by fire in 1499 when Cardinal Jimenez de Cisneros made a public auto-da-fé in Granada, burning 1,025,000 Arabic volumes.

Poetic genres

Romantic poetry

Another medieval Arabic love story was Hadith Bayad wa Riyad (The Story of Bayad and Riyad), a 13th-century Arabic love story written in al-Andalus. The main characters of the tale are Bayad, a merchant's son and a foreigner from Damascus, and Riyad, a well-educated girl in the court of an unnamed Hajib of al-Andalus (vizier or minister), whose equally unnamed daughter, whose retinue includes Riyad, is referred to as the Lady. The Hadith Bayad wa Riyad manuscript is believed to be the only illustrated manuscript known to have survived from more than eight centuries of Muslim and Arab presence in Spain.

There were several elements of courtly love which were developed in Arabic poetry, namely the notions of "love for love's sake" and "exaltation of the beloved lady" which have been traced back to Arabic literature of the 9th and 10th centuries. The notion of the "ennobling power" of love was developed in the early 11th century by the Persian psychologist and philosopher, Ibn Sina (known as "Avicenna" in English), in his Arabic treatise Risala fi'l-Ishq (Treatise on Love). The final element of courtly love, the concept of "love as desire never to be fulfilled," was also at times implicit in Arabic poetry.

The 10th century Encyclopedia of the Brethren of Purity features a fictional anecdote of a "prince who strays from his palace during his wedding feast and, drunk, spends the night in a cemetery, confusing a corpse with his bride. The story is used as a gnostic parable of the soul's pre-existence and return from its terrestrial sojourn."

Many of the tales in the One Thousand and One Nights are also love stories or involve romantic love as a central theme, including the frame story of Scheherazade, and many of the stories she narrates, such as "Aladdin," "Ali Baba," "The Ebony Horse" and "The Three Apples."

Satirical poetry

The genre of Arabic satirical poetry was known as hija. Biting satirical poetry was dreaded for its power to immortalize its subjects in insulting ways, and could include sexual, scatological, and religiously profane material. The only way to recover from a satirical insult delivered in poetry was to respond in kind, which meant naqa'id, or satirical duels involving exchanges of poems, were a distinctive part of early Arabic poetry. 

In a tribal context, hija was often used to mock the poet's enemies or the virtue of rival tribes. Court poets like Abu Nuwas also employed satire, lampooning political figures like the vizier Ja'far ibn Yahya.  After leaving Egypt, al-Mutanabbi mocked the eunuch ruler Abu al-Misk Kafur with a satirical poem: "Till I met this eunuch, I always assumed that the head was the seat of wisdom, but when I looked into his intelligence, I discovered that all his wisdom resided in his testicles."

In the 10th century, the writer al-Tha'alibi recorded satirical poetry written by the poets as-Salami and Abu Dulaf, with as-Salami praising Abu Dulaf's wide breadth of knowledge and then mocking his ability in all these subjects, and with Abu Dulaf responding back and satirizing as-Salami in return. Another 10th-century poet, Jarir ibn Atiyah, satirized Farazdaq by using the term "Farazdaq-like" to describe an individual who was a "transgressor of the Shari'a". Abu Nuwas, in the 9th century, once responded to an insult from Hashim bin Hudayj, a philosopher, by composing verses sarcastically praising his wisdom, then imploring him to use his knowledge to explain how the penis functions. 

Poetic themesMadih, a eulogy or panegyricHija, a lampoon or insult poemRithā', an elegyWasf, a descriptive poemGhazal, a love poem, sometimes expressing love of menKhamriyyah, wine poetryTardiyyah, hunt poetryKhawal, homiletic poetryFakhr, boastingHamasah, war poetry

Poetic forms

Poetry in Arabic is traditionally grouped in a diwan or collection of poems. These can be arranged by poet, tribe, topic or the name of the compiler such as the Asma'iyyat of al-Asma'i. Most poems did not have titles and they were usually named from their first lines. Sometimes they were arranged alphabetically by their rhymes. The role of the poet in Arabic developed in a similar way to poets elsewhere. The safe and easy patronage in royal courts was no longer available but a successful poet such as Nizar Qabbani was able to set up his own publishing house.

A large proportion of all Arabic poetry is written using the monorhyme, Qasidah. This is simply the same rhyme used on every line of a poem. While this may seem a poor rhyme scheme for people used to western literature it makes sense in a language like Arabic which has only three vowels which can be either long or short.

Mu'rabbah, literary ArabicQaridQit'ah, an elegy or short poem about an eventQasidah, an ode, designed to convey a message. A longer version of qit'ahMuwashshah, meaning "girdled," courtly love poetryRuba'i or dubayt, a quatrainRajaz, a discourse in rhyme, used to push the limits of lexicography

Malhunah, vernacular poetryKan ya ma kan, meaning "once upon a time"QumaZajal, meaning "shout"Mawwal or Mawaliya, folk poetry in four rhyming linesNabati, the vernacular poetry of the tribes of the Arabian Peninsula and the Syrian Desert.Humayni, the vernacular poetry of Yemen.

Literary theory and criticism
Literary criticism in Arabic literature often focused on religious texts, and the several long religious traditions of hermeneutics and textual exegesis have had a profound influence on the study of secular texts. This was particularly the case for the literary traditions of Islamic literature.

Literary criticism was also employed in other forms of medieval Arabic literature and poetry from the 9th century, notably by al-Jahiz in his al-Bayan wa-'l-tabyin and al-Hayawan, and by Abdullah ibn al-Mu'tazz in his Kitab al-Badi.

Modern poetry

Beginning in the 19th and early 20th centuries, as part of what is now called "the Arabic renaissance" or "al-Nahda," poets like Francis Marrash, Ahmad Shawqi and Hafiz Ibrahim began to explore the possibility of developing the classical poetic forms.Somekh, pp. 36–82. Some of these neoclassical poets were acquainted with Western literature but mostly continued to write in classical forms, while others, denouncing blind imitation of classical poetry and its recurring themes, sought inspiration from French or English romanticism.

A common theme in much of the new poetry was the use of the ghazal or love poem in praise of the poet's homeland. This was manifested either as a nationalism for the newly emerging nation states of the region or in a wider sense as an Arab nationalism emphasising the unity of all Arab people. The poems of praise (madih), and the lampoon (hija) also returned. Shawqi produced several works praising the reforming Turkish leader Kemal Atatürk, but when Atatürk abolished the caliphate, Shawqi was not slow in attacking him in verse. Political views in poetry were often more unwelcome in the 20th century than they had been in the 7th, and several poets faced censorship or, in the case of Abd al-Wahhab al-Bayyati, exile.

After World War II, there was a largely unsuccessful movement by several poets to write poems in free verse (shi'r hurr). Most of these experiments were abandoned in favour of prose poetry, of which the first examples in modern Arabic literature are to be found in the writings of Francis Marrash, and of which one of two of the most influential proponents were Nazik al-Malaika and Iman Mersal. The development of modernist poetry also influenced poetry in Arabic. The closer the Arab poets approached to European poetry, the more anxious they became to look for new media, themes, techniques, metaphors and forms to liberate themselves from conventional poetry. Iraqi poet Badr Shakir al-Sayyab is considered to be the originator of free verse in Arabic poetry. More recently, poets such as Adunis have pushed the boundaries of stylistic experimentation even further.

Poetry retains a very important status in the Arab world.
Well-known Iraqi poets include al-Mutanabbi, Abdul Razzak Abdul Wahid, Lamia Abbas Amara, Nazik Al-Malaika, Muhammad Mahdi al-Jawahiri, Badr Shaker al-Sayyab, Ahmed Matar, Abd al-Wahhab Al-Bayati, Wahid Khayoun, Mustafa Jamal al-Din and Muzaffar Al-Nawab.
Mahmoud Darwish was regarded as the Palestinian national poet, and his funeral was attended by thousands of mourners. Syrian poet Nizar Qabbani addressed less political themes, but was regarded as a cultural icon, and his poems provide the lyrics for many popular songs. Other well-known Syrian poets include Badawi al-Jabal and Adunis.

Reality television poetry competitions like Prince of Poets and Million's Poet exist to promote classical Arabic poetry and Nabati poetry respectively. Notable contestants in these competitions include Tamim al-Barghouti, Hissa Hilal, and Hisham al Gakh.

See also
List of Arabic language poets
Arabic literature
Arabic music

References

Sources

Bosworth, Clifford Edmund (1976). The Mediaeval Islamic Underworld: the Banu Sasan in Arabic Society and Literature. Brill. .
Hamori, Andras (1971). "An Allegory from the Arabian Nights: the City of Brass", Bulletin of the School of Oriental and African Studies. Cambridge University Press.
Jayyusi, Salma Khadra (1977). Trends and Movements in Modern Arabic Poetry. Volume I. Brill. .
Marzolph, Ulrich; van Leeuwen, Richard; Wassouf, Hassan (2004). The Arabian Nights Encyclopedia. ABC-CLIO. .
Monroe, James T. (2004). Hispano-Arabic Poetry: a Student Anthology. Gorgias Press. .
Moreh, Shmuel (1976). Modern Arabic Poetry 1800–1970: the Development of its Forms and Themes under the Influence of Western Literature. Brill. .
Moreh, Shmuel (1988). Studies in Modern Arabic Prose and Poetry. Brill. .
Somekh (1992), "The Neo-Classical Poets", in M. M. Badawi (ed.), Modern Arabic Literature. Cambridge University Press. .
Wagner, Ewald (1987), Grundzüge der klassischen arabischen Dichtung. Darmstadt: Wissenschaftliche Buchgesellschaft.
Von Grunebaum, G. E. (1952). "Avicenna's Risâla fî 'l-'išq and Courtly Love", Journal of Near Eastern Studies.

Further reading
El-Rouayheb, Khaled (2005). "The Love of Boys in Arabic Poetry of the Early Ottoman Period, 1500–1800," Middle Eastern Literatures. Volume VIII.
Kennedy, Philip F. (1997). The Wine Song in Classical Arabic Poetry: Abu Nuwas and the Literary Tradition. Clarendon Press. .
Stetkevych, Suzanne Pinckney (1993). The Mute Immortals Speak: Pre-Islamic Poetry and the Poetics of Ritual. Cornell University Press. .
 Athamneh, Waed (2017). Modern Arabic Poetry: Revolution and Conflict. University of Notre Dame Press.
 Abdel-Malek, Zaki N. Towards A New Theory of Arabic Prosody: A Textbook For Students and Instructors.''

External links
Schematised Arabic metres
Online classical Arabic poetry, to read and to listen
Specimens of Arabian poetry, from the earliest time to the extinction of the Khaliphat, with some account of the authors (1796)
Arabic Chrestomathy : selected passages from Arabic prose-writers, with an appendix containing some specimens of ancient Arabic poetry; with a complete glossary (1911)
The Tajdid Online Forum

 
Poetry by language
sr:Арапска књижевност